Waste of MFZB is the fifth studio album released by American punk rock band Zebrahead exclusively in Japan, it is also their final album with band member Justin Mauriello, who left the group shortly afterwards.

As the title suggests, the album is made up of songs that never made the final cut of the band's previous release MFZB, except for the cover of the song "Wannabe" by Spice Girls, which was recorded during production for the band's third studio album Playmate of the Year.

Track listing

Notes
The song "Lightning Rod" features on the single for "Rescue Me" from the band's previous release MFZB, but under the title "Outcast."

Singles
"Are You for Real?" - the only single released from the album. The majority of radio airplay received from the song was in Japan, a music video accompanied its release.

Personnel
Zebrahead
Ali Tabatabaee - lead vocals
Justin Mauriello - lead vocals, rhythm guitar
Greg Bergdorf - lead guitar
Ben Osmundson - bass guitar
Ed Udhus - drums
Art
Jam Suzuki
Takaaki Numano (MINDWRAP) (front cover)
Jeff "Dirt" Conley (art concept)

Charting positions

References

Booklet inlay of Waste of MFZB

External links
Zebrahead

Zebrahead albums
2004 albums